Alipio Ponce is a Peruvian football club based in the city of Mazamari, Satipo, Junín, Peru.

The club is the biggest of Mazamari city.

The club play in the Copa Perú which is the third division of the Peruvian league.

History
The club have played at the highest level of Peruvian football on three occasions, from 1988 Torneo Descentralizado until 1990 Torneo Descentralizado when was relegated.

Honours

Regional
Región V:
Winners (1): 2013

Liga Departamental de Junín:
Winners (3): 1987, 2012, 2013
Runner-up (1): 2016

Liga Provincial de Satipo:
Winners (10): 2009, 2010, 2011, 2012, 2013, 2014, 2016, 2017, 2018, 2022

Liga Distrital de Mazamari:
Winners (9): 2009, 2010, 2011, 2012, 2013, 2015, 2017, 2018, 2019

See also
List of football clubs in Peru
Peruvian football league system

References

Football clubs in Peru